The National Unionist Zamindara Party is a political party in Rajasthan, India. It was founded in 2013 by Guar farmers to represent their interests. While there is no connection to the historic Punjab Unionists, the party honours the legacy of Unionist leaders like Sir Chhotu Ram. The party won 2 seats in the 2013 state election.

References

Political parties in Rajasthan
Political parties established in 2013
Agrarian parties in India
2013 establishments in Rajasthan